The 1934 Cincinnati Bearcats football team was an American football team that represented the University of Cincinnati as a member of the Buckeye Athletic Association during the 1934 college football season. In their fourth and final season under head coach Dana M. King, the Bearcats compiled a 6–2–1 record (3–0–1 against conference opponents).

Schedule

References

Cincinnati
Cincinnati Bearcats football seasons
Cincinnati Bearcats football